Jim Reid (born August 3, 1945) is an American former basketball player who was a forward in the National Basketball Association. Reid was drafted in the fifth round of the 1967 NBA draft by the Philadelphia 76ers and played that season with the team. He was later selected by the Milwaukee Bucks in the 1968 NBA Expansion Draft.

References

1945 births
Living people
American men's basketball players
Forwards (basketball)
Philadelphia 76ers draft picks
Philadelphia 76ers players
Winston-Salem State Rams men's basketball players